Aleksandar Ilić may refer to:

 Aleksandar Ilić (politician) (born 1945), politician, diplomat and professor of literature at Belgrade University
 Aleksandar Ilić (footballer, born 1969), Serbian football manager and former footballer
 Aleksandar Ilić (footballer, born 1994), Bosnian Serb footballer

See also
 Sanja Ilić (Aleksandar "Sanja" Ilić; 1951–2021), Serbian and Yugoslav musician and composer